Trussell is a surname. Notable people with the surname include:

 Edmund Trussell, MP for Northamptonshire in 1330
James Trussell, PhD (1949–2018) Professor of Public and International Affairs, Princeton University
John Trussell, MP for Northamptonshire in 1404 and 1414
 John Trussell (1575–1648), English Historical Writer
Sumner L. Trussell (1860–1931), judge of the United States Board of Tax Appeals
 Sir William Trussell (died 1346), Speaker of the House of Commons who informed Edward II of Parliament's vote of no confidence in him and became Edward III's Secretary and emissary overseas
 William Trussell (died 1364), son of the above. Receiver of the Chamber in 1333
 William Trussell, MP for Leicestershire in 1421
 William Trussell, MP for Leicestershire in 1472 and 1477

See also
Acton Trussell, village in the English county of Staffordshire
Acton Trussell and Bednall, civil parish in Staffordshire, England
Marston Trussell, village and civil parish in Northamptonshire in England
The Trussell Trust, co-ordinators of a network of food banks in the UK